The retromandibular vein (temporomaxillary vein, posterior facial vein) is a major vein of the face.

Anatomy

Origin 
The retromandibular vein is formed by the union of the superficial temporal and maxillary veins.

Course 
It descends in the substance of the parotid gland, superficial to the external carotid artery (but beneath the facial nerve), between the ramus of the mandible and the sternocleidomastoideus muscle.

It terminates by dividing into two branches:
 an anterior, which passes forward and joins anterior facial vein, to form the common facial vein, which then drains into the internal jugular vein.
 a posterior, which is joined by the posterior auricular vein and becomes the external jugular vein.

Function 
The retromandibular vein provides venous drainage to the superior cranium, and significant drainage to the ear.

Clinical significance 

Parrot's sign is a sensation of pain when pressure is applied to the retromandibular region.

Additional images

References

External links
  - "Infratemporal fossa: The Pterygoid plexus of Veins"
 
 Tufts.edu

Veins of the head and neck